Testosterone isocaproate (TiCa), sold under the brand names Sustanon 100, Sustanon 250, and Omnadren 250, is an androgen and anabolic steroid medication and a testosterone ester which has been used as a component of mixed testosterone ester preparations.

See also
 List of androgen esters § Testosterone esters

References

Androgens and anabolic steroids
Androstanes
Isocaproate esters
Testosterone esters